The Pedro María Freites Municipality is one of the 21 municipalities (municipios) that makes up the eastern Venezuelan state of Anzoátegui and, according to the 2011 census by the National Institute of Statistics of Venezuela, the municipality has a population of 73,121. The town of Cantaura is the shire town of the Pedro María Freites Municipality. The municipality is named for Pedro María Freites.

Climate 
Minimum monthly temperature varies with elevation between 19.8 and 22.8 °C while maximum temperatures are between 30.5 and 33.6 °C. Annual precipitation is between 968 and 1109 mm, with most rainfall between June and August, and the driest quarter between January and March.

Demographics
The Pedro María Freites Municipality, according to a 2007 population estimate by the National Institute of Statistics of Venezuela, has a population of 76,892 (up from 68,146  in 2000). This amounts to 5.2% of the state's population.

Government

The mayor of the Pedro María Freites Municipality is Evelín Urdaneta, re-elected November 23, 2008 with 52% of the vote. The municipality is divided into four parishes; Capital Pedro María Freites, Libertador, Santa Rosa, and Urica.

References

External links
pedrofreites-anzoategui.gob.ve 

Municipalities of Anzoategui